= Duplex Art Gallery =

- Established: 2004
- Dissolved: 2020
- Location: Sarajevo, Bosnia and Herzegovina
- Coordinates: 43°52′N 18°25′E
- Type: Art gallery
- Collection size: 3,000
- Director: Pierre Courtin

The Duplex Art Gallery was a private art gallery in Sarajevo, Bosnia and Herzegovina. It was established in 2004 by French artist Pierre Courtin. The twin galleries Galerija10m2 and Duplex100m2, that were run under the Duplex banner, hosted more than 200 exhibitions in Sarajevo and over 25 multimedia projects in Belgrade, Zagreb, Paris, Budapest, Athens, New Orleans, New York, Vienna, Lyon, Stockholm and Montreal.

The gallery ceased to exist in 2020.
